Emanuel Faria Braga (born 7 July 1975), known simply as Emanuel, is a Portuguese retired footballer who played as a midfielder.

He amassed Segunda Liga totals of 325 matches and 34 goals during 13 seasons, representing five clubs.

Football career
Born in Vila do Conde, Emanuel played for Boavista F.C. in the 1999–2000 season, during the Porto club's Primeira Liga and European heyday. Other than that, he represented hometown's Rio Ave FC, where he started his career, as well as other northern sides: C.D. Aves (two spells), S.C. Salgueiros, Varzim S.C. and S.C. Freamunde.

Emanuel's Portuguese top division totals consisted of 109 games and eight goals over five seasons, for Rio Ave (1996 to 1999) and Boavista. The rest of his 18-year career was spent in the second level, with the exception of his final campaign (2010–11), with A.D. Os Limianos in the fourth.

External links

1975 births
Living people
People from Vila do Conde
Portuguese footballers
Association football midfielders
Primeira Liga players
Liga Portugal 2 players
Segunda Divisão players
Rio Ave F.C. players
Boavista F.C. players
C.D. Aves players
S.C. Salgueiros players
Varzim S.C. players
S.C. Freamunde players
Sportspeople from Porto District